Miami Whitewater Forest is the largest park in the Great Parks of Hamilton County with . It is located in Hamilton County, Ohio, just northwest of Cincinnati. Included in the park are the  paved Shaker Trace Trail as well as many other shorter trails. There is also a golf course, a  campground, horseback riding, and many sports offered. 46 modern campsites are available, with electric hookups and a fire pit.

In 2009 the park district spent $60,000 to build a brush recycling center at the park, and another $13,000 to build ponds for fishing bluegill.

In 2015 the Hamilton County park opened a dog park. It is the second dog park in the county park system.

References

External links

 Official site
 Map of the park

Parks in Hamilton County, Ohio